Abdul Hameed (Urdu: -‎; 1928 – 29 April 2011) was an Urdu fiction writer from Pakistan. He was also known for writing a popular children's TV play Ainak Wala Jin (1993) for Pakistan Television Corporation which was broadcast on PTV during the mid-1990s. In 1997, he was awarded Pride of Performance by the Government of Pakistan.

Biography

Early life and education 
Hameed was born in 1928 in Amritsar, British India. He completed his high school education in Amritsar and migrated to Lahore after the independence of Pakistan in 1947 and finished some college education in Pakistan as a private candidate and joined Radio Pakistan, Lahore as an assistant script editor. After working at Radio Pakistan for several years, he started writing fiction book.

Career
Hameed's first collection of short stories 'Manzil Manzil' received popular acclaim and he became recognized romantic short story writer. Apart from writing short stories and novels, he wrote columns for national newspapers. He also wrote plays for radio and television.

Hameed has written more than 200 novels and 100 books on fiction and children's literature. In his youth, he was influenced by the Progressive Writers' Movement and especially by the writings of Krishan Chander. Urdu She'r Ki Dastan, Urdu Nasr ki Dastan (in which he has given information about the prose literature of many Urdu prose writers from Banda Nawaz Gesu Daraz to the recent prose writers of Deccan and Gujrat), Mirza Ghalib Lahore Mein and Dastango Ashfaq Ahmad are his most famous books.

His drama Ainak Wala Jin was popular with children which was aired on PTV during the mid-1990s. In 1996 he wrote a PTV documentary telefilm Operation Dwarka 1965. Moreover, his fantasy series of 100 novels for children known as the Ambar Naag Maria (series of books) increased his popularity. He was awarded Pride of Performance by the Government of Pakistan. He is the author of a Series named Mout Ke Taaqob Mia Pursuing the Death this series has three hundred episodes

Famous Novels 
 Atoon Series_ Ahram E Misar Say Farar
 Baharat Kay Firon (Bharti Dehshatgard)
 Baharat Kay Firon (Khufia Mission)
 Watan Kay Sarfarosh (Yalghar e Momin)
 Watan Kay Sarfarosh (Secret Agent)
 Gulistan e Adab Ki Sunehri Yadain
 Urdu Safarnam Paris Ki Sunehri Raatein]
 Peela Uddas Chand
 Rangoon Say Farar
 Veeran Gali Mai Larki
 Jab Dhaka Jal Raha Tha

Death
Abdul Hameed died of cardiac disease, diabetes and kidney problems on 29 April 2011 at the age of 83. His funeral was attended by many fellow writers including Ata ul Haq Qasmi and the veteran journalist Mujibur Rehman Shami.

Awards and recognition
Pride of Performance Award by the President of Pakistan in 1997.

References

1928 births
2011 deaths
Pakistani romantic fiction writers
Pakistani television writers
Pakistani dramatists and playwrights
Pakistani radio writers
Pakistani spy fiction writers
Pakistani broadcasters
Writers from Lahore
20th-century novelists
Writers from Amritsar
Punjabi people
Recipients of the Pride of Performance
Pakistani children's writers